Hammerin' Harry, known in Japan as , is a series of platforming video games developed and published by Irem in 1990.  The titles were developed and published for the arcades, Famicom, Game Boy, Super Famicom and Sony PSP platforms. The series is centered around the titular Harry (or "Genzo Tamura" in the original Japanese), a hammer-wielding carpenter who protects his hometown of Beranme from the corrupt construction companies that mean to tear it down.

Games
The following is a list of games released in the series.

Reception
The original arcade game received positive reviews from critics. John Cook of CU Amiga gave it a 93% score. Julian Rignall of Computer and Video Games magazine gave it a 91% score. Sinclair User magazine gave it an 87% score.

Spin-offs and related releases
Others were various Japan-only, pachinko machines, as well as home ports of them for PlayStation, PlayStation 2, Windows-operated PCs and Game Boy. Outside of the franchise, Hammerin' Harry was represented in a Japan-only Game Boy title, Shuyaku Sentai Irem Fighter along with three other Irem franchises: R-Type, Ninja Spirit and Mr. Heli. Hammerin' Harry can be seen on the arcade flyers of Ninja Baseball Bat Man, also by Irem.

Anime
There were 24 9-minute webisodes aired. A DVD compiling the episodes was released in April 2009.

References

External links

Official ''Ikuse! Gen-san'' anime website 

1990 video games
2008 anime ONAs
Irem games
Anime series
Anime based on video games
Arcade video games
Platform games
Video game franchises
Nintendo Entertainment System games
Nippon Animation
Video game franchises introduced in 1990
Video games developed in Japan